Malaysia Today is a Malaysian news blog founded in August 2004.

Founding 
Malaysia Today was launched about two weeks before the release of Anwar Ibrahim from prison on 2 September 2004; Anwar was once Deputy Prime Minister, but fell from grace after his actions during the 1997 Asian financial crisis, and was sacked by then Prime Minister Mahathir bin Mohamad. Raja Petra, who was the webmaster of the Free Anwar Campaign website, decided to form Malaysia Today shortly before Anwar's release as part of a "Free Malaysia" campaign. Raja Petra took credit for predicting that Anwar would be released several weeks before it actually occurred.

Censorship by the Malaysian Communications and Multimedia Commission 
On 27 August 2008 the Malaysia Today website was blocked by the Malaysian government, allegedly in response to unspecified reader comments to a 16 January 2008 article. The censorship was removed on 12 September 2008, but Raja Petra Kamaruddin was arrested the same day under the ISA (Internal Security Act). On 7 November 2008, he was freed from detention by Malaysian authorities after Shah Alam city High Court Justice Syed Ahmad Helmy Syed Ahmad granted his habeas corpus petition and ruled that his 12 September detention was illegal.

After he was freed Raja Petra went into exile. The editorial stance of the Malaysia Today blog also notably changed from an anti-Barisan Nasional stance to one that actively defended the ruling regime and attacked the opposition. This led to a sharp decline in credibility and readership with many questioning the reasons behind his U-turn.

See also 
 Malaysiakini
 The Malaysian Insider

References

External links 
 

Malaysian political websites
Malaysian political blogs
Malaysian blogs